Tower Road may refer to:

Florida State Road 9336
Tower Road (Malta)
Tower Road, Nova Scotia

Odonyms referring to a building